Greta Scacchi, OMRI (born 18 February 1960) is an Italian-Australian actress. She holds dual Italian and Australian citizenship. She is best known for her roles in the films White Mischief (1987), Presumed Innocent (1990), The Player (1992), Emma (1996), and Looking for Alibrandi (2000).

Her first leading role, in Heat and Dust (1983), earned her a BAFTA nomination for Best Newcomer to Film. For her portrayal of Empress Alexandra Fyodorovna of Russia in the television film, Rasputin: Dark Servant of Destiny (1996), she won a Primetime Emmy Award and earned a Golden Globe nomination for Best Supporting Actress. In 2006, Scacchi received a second Emmy nomination for her role in the television film Broken Trail, and earned her first Screen Actors Guild Award nomination.

Early life
Scacchi was born on 18 February 1960 in Milan, Italy, the daughter of Luca Scacchi, an Italian art dealer and painter, and Pamela Risbey, an English dancer and antiques dealer. Scacchi's parents divorced when she was four, and her mother returned to her native England with Greta and her two older brothers, first to London, then to Haywards Heath, West Sussex. 

In 1975, after her mother's remarriage, the family moved to Perth, Western Australia, where her stepfather was a visiting professor at the University of Western Australia (UWA). While in Perth, Scacchi attended Hollywood Senior High School and joined UWA's University Dramatic Society, where she made her theatrical debut at the New Dolphin Theatre in Edward Bond's play Early Morning under director Arne Neeme.

Career

In 1977, Scacchi returned to England to study at the Bristol Old Vic Theatre School, where her contemporaries included Miranda Richardson and Amanda Redman. Her first on-screen role was in the first season finale of Bergerac, in 1981, when she played a model who was the girlfriend of an international criminal being pursued by the eponymous detective. The following year, she made her film debut in the German movie . Her first leading role was in the British film Heat and Dust (1983), opposite Shashi Kapoor and Julie Christie; Scacchi's performance earned her a BAFTA nomination for Best Newcomer to Film. She went on to give performances in films such as The Ebony Tower (1984), The Coca-Cola Kid (1985), White Mischief (1987), Presumed Innocent (1990), The Player (1992) and Country Life (1994). She turned down the role of Catherine Trammell in Basic Instinct (1992).

In 1996, she won an Emmy Award for her work as Empress Alexandra Fyodorovna of Russia in the television film, Rasputin: Dark Servant of Destiny, and was nominated for a Golden Globe and numerous other awards. In 1999, she had a role as an Italian-Australian single mother in the Australian film Looking for Alibrandi, a performance for which she won the 2000 AFI award for Best Supporting Actress.

In 2007, she received an Emmy Award nomination for Outstanding Supporting Actress in a Miniseries or a Movie for Broken Trail.

Scacchi is fluent in English, French, German, and Italian, which has made her a popular choice for European casting directors.

She has performed in a wide range of parts in theatre. She appeared In Times Like These (Bristol Old Vic) and Cider with Rosie (Phoenix Arts Theatre, Leicester) as her film career was taking off. After making four films in 15 months, in 1985 she appeared with Mark Rylance and Kevin McNally in Airbase (Oxford Playhouse and Arts Theatre). In Uncle Vanya at the Vaudeville Theatre, London, in 1987, she played opposite Michael Gambon and Jonathan Pryce. In 1991, she played Nora in Ibsen's A Doll's House in the Festival of Perth. A year later, she played the lead role in Strindberg's Miss Julie for the Sydney Theatre Company. She returned to Sydney in 1996 to play Cecilia in Sam Shepard's Simpatico. In 1999, she took the lead in Easy Virtue in Chichester, directed by actress Maria Aitken.

In 2001, she returned to Sydney for Harold Pinter's Old Times, directed by Aarne Neeme, playing Kate. In 2004 she toured Italy with an Italian production Vecchi Tempi of the same play, but this time playing Anne. In 2005, she performed at the Theatre Royal, Bath, in Thea Sharrock's production of Noël Coward's Private Lives. Back in Australia in 2008, she was nominated for a Sydney Theatre Best Actress Award for playing Queen Elizabeth in Schiller's Mary Stuart in Sydney.
 
In that year, she also performed in Terence Rattigan's The Deep Blue Sea at the Theatre Royal, Bath, on tour and then in the West End back at the Vaudeville Theatre. 
 	
In 2010, she replaced an injured Kristin Scott Thomas in the Chatelet Theatre, Paris in the French premiere (37 years after it was written) of Stephen Sondheim's A Little Night Music. As Desiree she sang "Send In The Clowns". 
 	
In May 2011, she appeared alongside Anita Dobson in the play Bette and Joan at London's Arts Theatre, directed by Bill Alexander, about the personal and professional relationship between Bette Davis and Joan Crawford. At the end of that year she appeared at the Ensemble Theatre, Sydney in David Williamson's new play, Nothing Personal.

In September 2013, Sir Jonathan Miller directed a gala performance of William Shakespeare's King Lear at The Old Vic in London. Scacchi played Regan.

In 2014, she played Arkadina in Chekhov's The Seagull in Perth. In 2015 she joined the Headlong theatre company to star on a UK tour in Tennessee Williams' The Glass Menagerie as Amanda. 
 	
Between 20 August and 12 November 2016, she played Phoebe Rice opposite Kenneth Branagh's Archie Rice in a revival of John Osborne's The Entertainer at the Garrick Theatre in London's West End. The play received mixed reviews but hers were uniformly positive.

Personal life
Scacchi is an Italian citizen by birth. She applied for British citizenship after turning 18, but was refused and refused again on appeal; she later applied again due to Brexit. She is a citizen of Italy, Australia and the United Kingdom.

From 1983 to 1989, Scacchi was in a relationship with New Zealand musician Tim Finn. She had a four-year relationship with American actor Vincent D'Onofrio, with whom she has a daughter, actress Leila George. In 1997, Scacchi began a relationship with her first cousin, Carlo Mantegazza. They have a son, Matteo.

Scacchi is an active supporter of campaigns and organisations that promote environmental causes. She has supported Greenpeace and Christian Aid's climate change campaign. In 2009, she posed nude with a codfish to promote the documentary The End of the Line, a film exposing the effects of overfishing. She continues to lead the linked Fishlove campaign, which has seen a host of well known actors pose for photographs with a variety of fish.

In October 2013, for her services to the arts she was awarded Cavaliere Ordine al Merito della Repubblica Italiana (Knight in the Order of Merit of the Italian Republic).

Filmography

Theatre

References

External links

Interview in the Spectator

1960 births
Actresses from Milan
Alumni of Bristol Old Vic Theatre School
Australian film actresses
Italian film actresses
Italian expatriates in England
Australian expatriates in England
People of Lombard descent
Australian television actresses
Italian emigrants to Australia
Italian emigrants to the United Kingdom
Italian people of English descent
Knights of the Order of Merit of the Italian Republic
Living people
Logie Award winners
Naturalised citizens of Australia
Outstanding Performance by a Supporting Actress in a Miniseries or Movie Primetime Emmy Award winners
Actresses from Perth, Western Australia
Best Supporting Actress AACTA Award winners